Madison 56ers is an American soccer team based in Madison, Wisconsin, United States. Founded in 2005, the team plays in the United Premier Soccer League. Prior to the 2009 season the team was known as the Princeton 56ers.

Since their inception the club has called Breese Stevens Field its home pitch. The team played one season at Warner Park in 2008 due to renovations at Breese Stevens Field. The team's colors are red, black and white.

The 56ers NPSL side is part of the Madison 56ers Soccer Club, which was founded in 1956. The club has won 22 youth state championships, one men's national championship, six men's state championships, four men's USASA Region II championships and three women's state championships. The 56ers also have a team in the Women's Premier Soccer League that began in 2010.

History
The team's first game was a 5–1 victory over Minnesota club Inferno 95 in a friendly on May 15, 2005 at Breese Stevens Field, with Jed Hohlbein scoring the team's first goal. The team finished 6–8 overall, third in the NPSL Midwest with a 5–5 record, behind NPSL champion Detroit and Milwaukee. Hohlbein was named to the inaugural NPSL All-Midwest team.

In 2006, the Princeton 56ers were 12–2–4 overall and won the NPSL Midwest title with an 8–0–2 record. They lost to the Sacramento Knights 2–0 in the NPSL championship game on July 29, 2006, with Anthony Chimienti and Alfredo Renteria scoring in the final 19 minutes. The game drew a team-record crowd of 1,351. Goalkeeper Eric Mickschl was named the NPSL Midwest MVP, while teammate Jed Hohlbein also made the All-Midwest team for the second time.

In 2007, the team went 13–3–1 overall and repeated as NPSL Midwest champion with an 8–1–1 record. They lost to the Southern California Fusion 1–0 in the NPSL semi-finals on July 27, 2007 in La Mesa, California, then defeated the Sonoma County Sol 1–0 in the third-place match on July 28, 2007. Midfielder Brad Ring was named the NPSL Midwest MVP, and was joined on the All-Midwest team by goalkeeper Ryan Germann, defender Reed Cooper, defender-midfielder Tenzin Rampa and forward Jed Hohlbein. The 56ers made their debut in U.S. Open Cup qualifying in 2007, as the NPSL representative. They lost to Detroit United 2–1 in the first round of the USASA Region II qualifying tournament on April 21. A match against German Fourth Division side SC Wiedenbrück on June 23, 2007, was their first match against international competition.

In 2008, the team went 7–3–2 overall and tied for second place in the NPSL Midwest with a 3–1–2 record. Henry Aiyenero was the team's leading scorer with five goals. Jed Hohlbein, Brad Ring, Reed Cooper and midfielder Trevor Banks were named to the All-Midwest team. In the 2008 U.S. Open Cup, they won by forfeit over the Bloomington (Ind.) Cutters in the first round of Region II qualifying, then lost to RWB Adria 2–0 in the semi-finals.

In 2009, the team finished 8–3–2 overall and 5–2–1 in the NPSL Midwest, tying the St. Paul Twin Stars and the Chicago Fire NPSL atop the standings. The Twin Stars were awarded the regional title and a berth in the NPSL national semi-finals on a tiebreaker. Keith Dangarembwa led the team with four goals and was one of five 56ers players named to the All-Midwest team, joining goalkeeper Jon Szafranski, midfielder Pablo Delgado and defenders Trevor Banks and Brian Bultman. The 56ers made their debut in the USASA Region II Amateur Cup, losing to Croatia Cleveland 3–0, then defeating FC Indiana 3–1 and Illinois' AAC Eagles 5–3 at the competition in Oak Forest, Ill., but failing to advance to the final.

In 2010, the team finished 10–7–2 overall and 8–2–0 in the NPSL Midwest, claiming its third regional championship. The 56ers lost to Chattanooga FC 2–0 in the NPSL national semi-finals on July 29, 2010, and lost to FC Sonic Lehigh Valley 3–1 in the third-place match on July 30, 2010. Brazilian Werebetth Rocha, known as Betinho, led the team with eight goals. Midfielder Trevor Banks was named to the All-Midwest team for the third time, while midfielder Keenan Newallo, defender Brian Bultman and goalkeeper Jon Szafranski were honored for the second time. Defender Sean Ronnekleiv-Kelly, in his first season with the team, also was an all-region selection. The 56ers finished 0–1–1 at the USASA Region II Amateur Cup, tying Detroit United 1–1 and losing to Illinois' Inferno SC 3–0; their scheduled finale against St. Louis Kutis SC was canceled due to field conditions with both teams out of contention for advancement.

In 2011, the 56ers made their first appearance in the U.S. Open Cup since starting the NPSL team. An earlier men's amateur team from the club qualified for the tournament in 1988, 1989, 1990 and 1991.

In 2015, after winning the Midwest conference of the NPSL, the club switched to the second-year Premier League of America.

Alumni
Jed Hohlbein, who starred at nearby Middleton High School and played two seasons at the University of Wisconsin–Madison, led the team in goals in each of its first three seasons, scoring 10 in 2005 and 13 in both 2006 and 2007. He scored three goals in 2008 and one in 2010 and is the team's career leading scorer with 40 goals.

Hohlbein had the 56ers' first hat trick in a 3–2 home victory over the St. Paul Twin Stars on May 20, 2006, then added another in a 4–1 home friendly win over German side SC Wiedenbruck on June 23, 2007. Andre Francois also had a hat trick in a 9–1 home win over the Madison Latino League All-Stars in a friendly on July 2, 2006. Henry Aiyenero had the fourth three-goal game in team history on July 12, 2008 in a 7–0 win over the Milwaukee Bavarians and Betinho posted the fifth on June 28, 2010 in a 9–1 victory over Eau Claire Aris FC. The nine goals against the Madison Latino League All-Stars in 2006 and Eau Claire Aris FC in 2010 stand as the team record for goals in a match.

Eight 56ers players have gone on to professional careers. Defender Aaron Hohlbein, like his older brother a former standout at Middleton High School and the University of Wisconsin–Madison, was selected by the Kansas City Wizards with the third pick of the 2007 MLS Supplemental Draft. He signed a senior contract with the Wizards on March 1, 2007, and made his MLS debut on April 14, 2007. He spent time on loan with Miami FC Blues of the U.S. Soccer Federation Division-2 Pro League in 2010 and signed with the team in 2011, when it was renamed the Fort Lauderdale Strikers and joined the North American Soccer League. Midfielder-defender Noah Goerlitz, a native of Neenah, Wisconsin who also played at the University of Wisconsin–Madison, played with Canterbury United in the New Zealand Football Championship in the 2006–2007 season. Brad Ring, a midfielder for the team in 2007 and 2008, was selected by the San Jose Earthquakes with the 17th pick of the 2009 MLS SuperDraft. Jed Hohlbein played with VfR Süsterfeld Kassel in Germany in 2009, helping the team earn promotion from the Seventh Division in the process. Midfielder Andy Adlard was selected by the Columbus Crew in the third round of the 2011 MLS Supplemental Draft and signed with the club on February 21, 2011. Scott Lorenz and Alex Horwath, also former University of Wisconsin–Madison standouts, were free agents who signed with MLS teams in 2011, Lorenz with Sporting Kansas City and Horwath with New York Red Bulls. Forward J. C. Banks signed with the Rochester Rhinos in the USL Professional Division and currently plays for Forward Madison Football Club in the USL League One.

Supporters
Founded in 2014, the Capitol City Supporters, or "Cap City" for short, is the independent supporters club for the Madison 56ers SC. Cap City prides itself creating a culture that shows passion for the 56ers and the city of Madison. The Red Rebels were an earlier supporters group dedicated to the 56ers and Wisconsin Badgers.

Players

2018 Roster
Source:

Season-by-season

Honors

Domestic
National Premier Soccer League
Midwest Division (NPSL):
 Winners (4): 2006, 2007, 2010, 2012,

Head coaches
  Jim Launder (2005–present)

Launder coached the University of Wisconsin–Madison men's soccer team to its only NCAA championship in 1995 and was an assistant coach for the Columbus Crew of Major League Soccer from 2002 to 2004. From 2005 to 2007, their assistant coach was Danny van Mol, who also was a player-assistant coach for the team in 2005. Enzo Fuschino served as assistant coach in 2008. Henry Aiyenero was a player-assistant coach in 2010 and 2011. Jed Hohlbein took over that role in 2012.

Stadia
 Breese Stevens Field; Madison, Wisconsin (2005–2007, 2009–present)
 Warner Park; Madison, Wisconsin (2008)

References

External links
Official Website
Madison 56ers NPSL

United Premier Soccer League teams
National Premier Soccer League teams
Association football clubs established in 2005
Soccer clubs in Wisconsin
2005 establishments in Wisconsin